Mark Turner (born November 10, 1965) is an American jazz saxophonist.

Biography
Born in Fairborn, Ohio, and raised in the small Southern California town of Palos Verdes Estates, Turner originally intended to become a commercial artist. In elementary school he played the clarinet, followed by the alto and tenor saxophones in high school. He attended California State University, Long Beach in the 1980s (playing in the jazz ensembles) and then transferred to and graduated from Berklee College of Music in 1990 before moving to New York. Turner worked at Tower Records in New York City for an extended period before working full-time as a jazz musician.

In early November 2008 Turner injured two fingers on one of his hands with a power saw, but as of late February 2009 he was performing again with the Edward Simon Quartet at the Village Vanguard.

He is married to the psychiatrist and anthropologist, Dr. Helena Hansen.

Style and influences
Turner's sound is reminiscent of that of Warne Marsh, but he also has elements of John Coltrane in his playing. Turner has mentioned both Marsh and Coltrane as influences, and has used elements of both players' styles in his music. Turner's range extends into the high altissimo register. His improvised lines tend to span several octaves and contain great harmonic and rhythmic complexity. His compositions often make use of repeated patterns, odd-metered time signatures, and intervallic leaps.

Turner claims that his music is "unfolding like a narrative". Consequently, his 2014 album Lathe of Heaven is named after Ursula K. Le Guin's novel of the same title which is based on the idea of a world where the nature of reality keeps shifting.

Musical associations
In September 2014, Turner released his first album as a leader since 2001 on ECM Records; it features trumpeter Avishai Cohen, bassist Joe Martin, and drummer Marcus Gilmore. Turner is a member of the trio  Fly, which includes himself, bassist Larry Grenadier, and drummer Jeff Ballard. He also appears in guitarist Gilad Hekselman's Quartet, and drummer Billy Hart's Quartet. Turner has recorded extensively with guitarist Kurt Rosenwinkel, saxophonist David Binney, and pianist Aaron Goldberg, among others.
Turner, the ultimate jazz sideman, has played or collaborated with more than 45 jazz bands. In 2018 and 2019 alone he has played on eight different jazz albums as a sideman or collaborator. (See Sideman and Collaborators below.)

Discography

As leader/co-leader 
 Yam Yam (Criss Cross, 1995)
 Warner Jams Vol. 2: The Two Tenors with James Moody (Warner Bros., 1997)
 Mark Turner (Warner Bros., 1998) – recorded in 1995
 In This World (Warner Bros., 1998)
 The Music of Mercedes Rossy (Fresh Sound, 1998)
 Ballad Session (Warner Bros., 2000) – recorded in 1999
 Two Tenor Ballads (Criss Cross, 2000)
 Consenting Adults with M.T.B. (Criss Cross, 2000)
 Dharma Days (Warner Bros., 2001)
 Dusk Is a Quiet Place with Baptiste Trotignon (Naive, 2013)
 Lathe of Heaven (ECM, 2014) – recorded in 2013
 Temporary Kings with Ethan Iverson (ECM, 2018) – recorded in 2017
 Mark Turner Meets Gary Foster with Gary Foster (Capri, 2019)[2CD] – live recorded in 2003
 Where Are You? with Kevin Hays, Marc Miralta (Fresh Sound, 2019) – recorded in 2018
 Return from the Stars (ECM, 2022) – recorded in 2019

As group 
Fly with Jeff Ballard and Larry Grenadier
 Fly (Savoy, 2004)
 Sky & Country (ECM, 2009)
 Year of the Snake (ECM, 2012)

SFJAZZ Collective
 Wonder (SFJAZZ, 2012)

 As sideman With  Reid Anderson Dirty Show Tunes (Fresh Sound, 1997)
 Abolish Bad Architecture (Fresh Sound, 1999)With Omer Avital Asking No Permission (Smalls, 2005) – live recorded in 1996
 The Ancient Art of Giving (Smalls, 2006)With David Binney Barefooted Town (Criss Cross, 2011)
 Cities and Desire (Criss Cross, 2006)With Jakob Bro Sidetracked (Loveland, 2005)
 Pearl River (Loveland, 2007)With George Colligan Constant Source (SteepleChase, 2000)
 The Newcomer (SteepleChase, 1997)
 Unresolved (Fresh Sound, 1999)With Benoit Delbecq Phonetics (Songlines, 2005)
 Spots On Stripes (Clean Feed, 2018)With Aaron Goldberg Turning Point (J-Curve, 1999)
 Home (Sunnyside, 2010)With Jon Gordon Witness (Criss Cross, 1996)
 Along the Way (Criss Cross, 1997)With Tom Harrell Trip (HighNote, 2014)
 Infinity (HighNote, 2019)With Billy Hart 2005: Billy Hart Quartet (HighNote, 2006)
 2011: All Our Reasons (ECM, 2012)
 2013: One Is the Other (ECM, 2014)With Jochen Rueckert Somewhere Meeting Nobody (Pirouet, 2011)
 We Make the Rules (Whirlwind, 2014)
 Charm Offensive (Pirouet, 2016)With Edward Simon Edward Simon (Kokopelli, 1995)
 La Bikina (Red, 2011)
 Venezuelan Suite (Sunnyside, 2013)With Kurt Rosenwinkel 1996: The Enemies of Energy (Verve, 2000)
 2000: The Next Step (Verve, 2000)
 2001–03: Heartcore (Verve, 2003)
 2006: The Remedy (ArtistShare, 2008)[2CD] – live
 2007–17: Caipi (Razdaz, 2017)With Gilad Hekselman Hearts Wide Open (Le Chant du Monde, 2011)
 This Just In (Jazz Village, 2013)With Matthias Lupri Same Time Twice (Summit, 2002)
 Transition Sonic (Summit, 2004)With Ibrahim Maalouf Wind (Mi'ster, 2012)
 Kalthoum (Mi'ster, 2015)With Joe Martin 2001: Passage (Fresh Sound, 2002)
 2018: Etoilee (Sunnyside, 2019)With Baptiste Trotignon Share (Naive, 2008)
 Suite (Naive, 2009)With David Virelles Motion (Justin Time, 2007)
 Continuum (Pi, 2012)With others' Carl Allen, Echoes of Our Heroes (Evidence, 1996)
 Jeff Ballard, Fairgrounds (Edition, 2019) – live recorded in 2015
 Diego Barber, Calima (Sunnyside, 2009)
 Joao Barradas, Portrait (Nischo, 2020)
 Seamus Blake, Four Track Mind (Criss Cross, 1997) – recorded in 1994
 Stefano Bollani, Joy in Spite of Everything (ECM, 2014)
 Chris Cheek, A Girl Named Joe (Fresh Sound, 1998)
 Yelena Eckemoff, A Touch of Radiance (L&H, 2014)
 Robert Glasper, Canvas (Blue Note, 2005)
 Russell Gunn, Love Requiem (HighNote, 1999)
 Anke Helfrich, You'll See (Double Moon, 2002)
 Ethan Iverson, Common Practice (ECM, 2019)
 Jonny King, In from the Cold (Criss Cross, 1994)
 Ryan Kisor, On the One (Columbia, 1993)
 Lee Konitz, Parallels (Chesky, 2001)
 Delfeayo Marsalis, Pontius Pilate's Decision (Novus, 1992)
 Francisco Mela, Cirio (Half Note, 2008)
 Ferenc Nemeth, Night Songs (Dreamers, 2007)
 Josh Ottum, Like the Season (Tapete, 2006)
 Leon Parker, Above & Below (Epicure, 1994)
 John Patitucci, Imprint (Concord Jazz, 2000) – recorded in 1999
 Perico Sambeat, Ademuz (Fresh Sound, 1998)
 Joshua Redman, Beyond (Warner Bros., 2000) – recorded in 1999
 Aldo Romano, The Jazzpar Prize (Enja, 2004)
 Jorge Rossy, Stay There (Pirouet, 2016)
 Enrico Rava, New York Days (ECM, 2009)
 Samo Salamon, Mamasaal feat. Mark Turner (Dometra, 2008)
 Jaleel Shaw, Perspective (Fresh Sound, 2005)
 Jimmy Smith, Damn! (Verve, 1995)
 Yeahwon Shin, Yeahwon (ArtistShare, 2010)
 Chris Wiesendanger, Urban Village (Fresh Sound, 2002)
 Mark Zubek, Twentytwodollarfishlunch'' (Fresh Sound, 2009)

References

Reviews
 In This World @ Allaboutjazz.com
 Dharma Days @ Jazznow.com
 Ballad Session @ Allaboutjazz.com
 G. Giddins: “Turner Classic Moves,” VV (April 14, 1998), 118
 G. M. Stern: “Airtime: Mark Turner: You Don’t Have to be Twenty Years Old to Succeed,” Windplayer, no.58 (1998), 10
 "Saxophonist Mark Turner's Stylistic Assimilation of Warne Marsh and the Tristano School," Master's Thesis by Jimmy Emerzian, California State University, Long Beach, 2008.

External links
 Mark Turner discography at Jazzdiscography.com
 interview short film with Mark Turner on his work with ECM Records
 Turner-Marsh-Tristano Thesis download links at Emerzianmusic.com
 Interview with Mark Turner, by Fred Jung

American jazz clarinetists
American jazz saxophonists
American male saxophonists
Manhattan School of Music faculty
People from Fairborn, Ohio
Living people
1965 births
Criss Cross Jazz artists
Berklee College of Music alumni
People from Palos Verdes Estates, California
21st-century American saxophonists
Jazz musicians from Ohio
21st-century clarinetists
21st-century American male musicians
American male jazz musicians
Kris Defoort Quartet members
Fly (band) members
SFJAZZ Collective members
Jazz musicians from California